The Writers Guild of America Award for Television: Best Written New Series is an award presented by the Writers Guild of America to the writers of the best new television series of the season. It has been awarded since the 58th Annual Writers Guild of America Awards in 2006. The year indicates when each season aired. The winners are highlighted in gold.

Winners and nominees

2000s

2010s

2020s

Total awards by network
6 awards
HBO

3 awards
ABC

1 award
AMC
FX
Hulu
Netflix
Showtime
USA Network

Total nominations by network

19 nominations
HBO

11 nominations
Netflix

10 nominations
FX

7 nominations
ABC
NBC
Showtime

5 nominations
AMC
Fox

4 nominations
Hulu

3 nominations
AppleTV+

2 nominations
Amazon
Disney+
HBO Max

1 nomination
CBS
Cinemax
Comedy Central
FXX
TNT
UPN
USA

References

Screenplay